Shabbona Grove is an unincorporated community in DeKalb County, Illinois, United States.

History
A post office called Shabbona Grove was established in 1844, and remained in operation until it was discontinued in 1933. Shabbona Grove was platted in 1885. The community was named for Shabbona, a Potawatomi chief.

Notable person
George Pierce, MLB pitcher for the Chicago Cubs and St. Louis Cardinals

References

Unincorporated communities in DeKalb County, Illinois
Unincorporated communities in Illinois